The Alismatales (alismatids) are an order of flowering plants including about 4500 species. Plants assigned to this order are mostly tropical or aquatic. Some grow in fresh water, some in marine habitats.

The anthophytes are a grouping of plant taxa bearing flower-like reproductive structures. They were formerly thought to be a clade comprising plants bearing flower-like structures.  The group contained the angiosperms - the extant flowering plants, such as roses and grasses - as well as the Gnetales and the extinct Bennettitales.

23,420 species of vascular plant have been recorded in South Africa, making it the sixth most species-rich country in the world and the most species-rich country on the African continent. Of these, 153 species are considered to be threatened. Nine biomes have been described in South Africa: Fynbos, Succulent Karoo, desert, Nama Karoo, grassland, savanna, Albany thickets, the Indian Ocean coastal belt, and forests.

The 2018 South African National Biodiversity Institute's National Biodiversity Assessment plant checklist lists 35,130 taxa in the phyla Anthocerotophyta (hornworts (6)), Anthophyta (flowering plants (33534)), Bryophyta (mosses (685)), Cycadophyta (cycads (42)), Lycopodiophyta (Lycophytes(45)), Marchantiophyta (liverworts (376)), Pinophyta (conifers (33)), and Pteridophyta (cryptogams (408)).

11 families are represented in the literature. Listed taxa include species, subspecies, varieties, and forms as recorded, some of which have subsequently been allocated to other taxa as synonyms, in which cases the accepted taxon is appended to the listing. Multiple entries under alternative names reflect taxonomic revision over time.

Alismataceae
Family Alismataceae, (7 species)

Alisma
Genus Alisma:
Alisma plantago-aquatica L. not indigenous, invasive

Burnatia
Genus Burnatia:
Burnatia enneandra P.Micheli, indigenous

Echinodorus
Genus Echinodorus:
Echinodorus cordifolius (L.) Griseb. not indigenous, invasive
Echinodorus tenellus (Mart. ex Schult.f.) Buchenau, not indigenous, invasive

Limnophyton
Genus Limnophyton:
Limnophyton obtusifolium (L.) Miq. indigenous

Sagittaria
Genus Sagittaria:
Sagittaria latifolia Willd. not indigenous, invasive
Sagittaria platyphylla (Engelm.) J.G.Sm. not indigenous, cultivated. invasive

Aponogetonaceae
Family Aponogetonaceae, (9 species)

Aponogeton
Genus Aponogeton:
Aponogeton angustifolius Aiton, endemic
Aponogeton desertorum Zeyh. ex A.Spreng. indigenous
Aponogeton distachyos L.f. endemic
Aponogeton fugax J.C.Manning & Goldblatt, endemic
Aponogeton junceus Lehm. indigenous
 Aponogeton junceus Lehm. subsp. natalense (Oliv.) Oberm. accepted as Aponogeton natalensis Oliv.
Aponogeton junceus Lehm. subsp. rehmannii (Oliv.) Oberm. accepted as Aponogeton rehmannii Oliv.
Aponogeton natalensis Oliv. endemic
Aponogeton ranunculiflorus Jacot Guill. & Marais, indigenous
Aponogeton rehmannii Oliv. indigenous
Aponogeton stuhlmannii Engl. indigenous

Araceae
Family Araceae,

Arum
Genus Arum:
Arum italicum Mill. not indigenous, cultivated, invasive

Colocasia
Genus Colocasia:
Colocasia antiquorum Schott var. esculenta Schott accepted as Colocasia esculenta (L.) Schott, not indigenous, invasive
Colocasia esculenta (L.) Schott, not indigenous, cultivated, invasive

Epipremnum
Genus Epipremnum:
Epipremnum aureum (Linden & Andre) G.S.Bunting, not indigenous, cultivated, invasive

Gonatopus
Genus Gonatopus:
Gonatopus angustus N.E.Br. indigenous
Gonatopus boivinii (Decne.) Engl. indigenous

Monstera
Genus Monstera:
Monstera deliciosa Liebm. not indigenous, cultivated, invasive

Pistia
Genus Pistia:
Pistia stratiotes L.	 not indigenous, cultivated, invasive

Stylochaeton
Genus Stylochaeton:
Stylochaeton natalensis Schott, indigenous

Syngonium
Genus Syngonium:
Syngonium podophyllum Schott, not indigenous, cultivated, invasive

Zamioculcas
Genus Zamioculcas:
Zamioculcas zamiifolia (Lodd.) Engl. indigenous

Zantedeschia
Genus Zantedeschia:
Zantedeschia aethiopica (L.) Spreng.	indigenous
 Zantedeschia albomaculata (Hook.) Baill. indigenous
 Zantedeschia albomaculata (Hook.) Baill. subsp. albomaculata indigenous
 Zantedeschia albomaculata (Hook.) Baill. subsp. macrocarpa (Engl.) Letty, indigenous
 Zantedeschia albomaculata (Hook.) Baill. subsp. valida Letty, accepted as Zantedeschia valida (Letty) Y.Singh
Zantedeschia elliottiana (W.Watson) Engl. endemic
Zantedeschia jucunda Letty, endemic
Zantedeschia odorata P.L.Perry, endemic
Zantedeschia pentlandii (R.Whyte ex W.Watson) Wittm. endemic
Zantedeschia rehmannii Engl. indigenous
Zantedeschia valida (Letty) Y.Singh, endemic

Cymodoceaceae
Family Cymodoceaceae,

Halodule
Genus Halodule:
Halodule uninervis (Forssk.) Asch. indigenous

Thalassodendron
Genus Thalassodendron:
Thalassodendron ciliatum (Forssk.) Hartog, indigenous

Hydrocharitaceae
Family Hydrocharitaceae,

Egeria
Genus Egeria:
Egeria densa Planch. not indigenous, invasive

Elodea
Genus Elodea:
Elodea canadensis Michx. not indigenous, invasive

Halophila
Genus Halophila:
Halophila ovalis (R.Br.) Hook.f.indigenous
Halophila ovalis (R.Br.) Hook.f. subsp. ovalis indigenous

Hydrilla
Genus Hydrilla:
Hydrilla verticillata (L.f.) Royle, not indigenous, invasive

Lagarosiphon
Genus Lagarosiphon:
Lagarosiphon cordofanus Casp. indigenous
Lagarosiphon major (Ridl.) Moss ex Wager, indigenous
Lagarosiphon muscoides Harv. indigenous
Lagarosiphon verticillifolius Oberm. indigenous

Najas
Genus Najas:
Najas graminea Delile, indigenous
Najas graminea Delile, var. graminea, indigenous
Najas horrida A.Braun ex Rendle, indigenous
Najas marina L. ex Magnus, indigenous
Najas marina L. ex Magnus subsp. armata (H.Lindb.) Horn, indigenous
Najas setacea (A.Br.) Rendle, indigenous

Ottelia
Genus Ottelia:
Ottelia exserta (Ridl.) Dandy, indigenous
Ottelia ulvifolia (Planch.) Walp. indigenous
Ottelia vernayi Bremek. & Oberm. accepted as Ottelia ulvifolia (Planch.) Walp.

Vallisneria
Genus Vallisneria:
Vallisneria aethiopica Fenzl, accepted as Vallisneria spiralis L.
Vallisneria spiralis L., indigenous

Juncaginaceae
Family Juncaginaceae,

Triglochin
Genus Triglochin:
 Triglochin buchenaui Kocke, Mering, Kadereit, indigenous
 Triglochin bulbosa L. indigenous
 Triglochin bulbosa L. subsp. bulbosa, endemic
 Triglochin bulbosa L. subsp. calcicola Mering, Kocke & Kadereit, indigenous
 Triglochin bulbosa L. subsp. quarcicola Mering, Kocke & Kadereit, endemic
 Triglochin bulbosa L. subsp. tenuifolia (Adamson) Horn, endemic
 Triglochin elongata Buchenau accepted as Triglochin bulbosa L.
 Triglochin milnei Horn, indigenous
 Triglochin striata Ruiz & Pav. indigenous

Lemnaceae
Family Lemnaceae,

Lemna
Genus Lemna:
Lemna aequinoctialis Welw. indigenous
Lemna gibba L. indigenous
Lemna minor L. indigenous

Spirodela
Genus Spirodela:
Spirodela polyrhiza (L.) Schleid. indigenous
Spirodela punctata (G.Mey.) C.H.Thomps. indigenous

Wolffia
Genus Wolffia:
Wolffia arrhiza (L.) Horkel ex Wimm. indigenous
Wolffia globosa (Roxb.) Hartog & Plas, indigenous

Wolffiella
Genus Wolffiella:
Wolffiella denticulata (Hegelm.) Hegelm. endemic
Wolffiella welwitschii (Hegelm.) Monod, indigenous

Limnocharitaceae
Family Limnocharitaceae,

Hydrocleys
Genus Hydrocleys:
Hydrocleys nymphoides (Willd.) Buchenau, not indigenous, invasive

Tenagocharis
Genus Tenagocharis:
Tenagocharis latifolia (D.Don) Buchenau, accepted as Butomopsis latifolia (D.Don) Kunth

Potamogetonaceae
Family Potamogetonaceae,

Althenia
Genus Althenia:
Althenia filiformis F.Petit, indigenous

Potamogeton
Genus Potamogeton:
Potamogeton crispus L. indigenous
Potamogeton nodosus Poir. indigenous
Potamogeton octandrus Poir. indigenous
Potamogeton pectinatus L. indigenous
Potamogeton pusillus L. indigenous
Potamogeton richardii Solms, indigenous
Potamogeton schweinfurthii A.Benn. indigenous
Potamogeton subjavanicus Hagstr. accepted as Potamogeton pusillus L.
Potamogeton thunbergii Cham. & Schltdl. accepted as Potamogeton nodosus Poir. indigenousPotamogeton trichoides Cham. & Schltdl. indigenousPotamogeton venosus A.Benn. accepted as Potamogeton schweinfurthii A.Benn.

Pseudoalthenia
Genus Pseudoalthenia:
Pseudoalthenia aschersoniana (Graebn.) Hartog, endemic

Zannichellia
Genus Zannichellia:
Zannichellia palustris L.  indigenous

Ruppiaceae
Family Ruppiaceae,

Ruppia
Genus Ruppia:
Ruppia cirrhosa (Petagna) Grande, indigenous
Ruppia maritima L. indigenous

Zosteraceae
Family Zosteraceae,

Nanozostera
Genus Nanozostera:
Nanozostera capensis (Setch.) Toml. & Posl. accepted as Zostera capensis Setch.

Zostera
Genus Zostera:
Zostera capensis Setch. indigenous

References

South African plant biodiversity lists
Alismatales